Aurora Eugenia China (born 12 September 1958) is a former Romanian archer and coach.

Career 
Chin took up archery in 1974 and was coached by Iosif Matei. At the 1980 Summer Olympic Games Chin finished thirteenth in the women's individual event with a score of 2319 points. She became a Master of Sport in 1981.

References

External links 
 Profile on worldarchery.org

1958 births
Living people
Romanian female archers
Olympic archers of Romania
Archers at the 1980 Summer Olympics